Lamar Township is a township in Clinton County, Pennsylvania. The population was 2,600 at the 2020 census.

Geography
The township is located in southern Clinton County and includes the unincorporated community of Rote. Interstate 80 runs east–west through the township, with one interchange (Exit 178): U.S. Route 220, which leads north to Mill Hall and Lock Haven, the county seat.

Demographics

As of the census of 2000, there were 2,450 people, 901 households, and 718 families residing in the township.  The population density was 59.8 people per square mile (23.1/km).  There were 967 housing units at an average density of 23.6/sq mi (9.1/km).  The racial makeup of the township was 99.10% White, 0.16% African American, 0.12% Native American, 0.16% Asian, and 0.45% from two or more races. Hispanic or Latino of any race were 0.37% of the population.

There were 901 households, out of which 32.4% had children under the age of 18 living with them, 70.5% were married couples living together, 6.0% had a female householder with no husband present, and 20.2% were non-families. 16.8% of all households were made up of individuals, and 9.7% had someone living alone who was 65 years of age or older.  The average household size was 2.72 and the average family size was 3.05.

In the township the population was spread out, with 24.7% under the age of 18, 8.4% from 18 to 24, 27.3% from 25 to 44, 25.0% from 45 to 64, and 14.6% who were 65 years of age or older.  The median age was 40 years. For every 100 females, there were 98.5 males.  For every 100 females age 18 and over, there were 95.1 males.

The median income for a household in the township was $35,332, and the median income for a family was $38,235. Males had a median income of $30,516 versus $19,278 for females. The per capita income for the township was $15,464.  About 7.8% of families and 9.9% of the population were below the poverty line, including 12.6% of those under age 18 and 13.8% of those age 65 or over.

References

Populated places established in 1800
Townships in Clinton County, Pennsylvania
Townships in Pennsylvania